The Cricket Writers' Club County Championship Player of the Year is an annual cricket award, presented to the player who is adjudged to have been the best of the year in the County Championship, England's first-class cricket competition. The award has been presented since the 2012 season and the winner is chosen by a vote amongst the members of the Cricket Writers' Club, an association open to "recognised correspondents of newspapers and periodicals and on radio and television". Any male player competing in the County Championship is eligible.

Nick Compton was the first recipient of the award in 2012, and is one of six winners to have been recognised for their batting exploits: the only bowlers to have won the award were Jamie Porter in 2017 and Simon Harmer in 2019. Harmer is also one of only two non-English players to have won, along with his South African compatriot Wayne Madsen. Players representing Essex have won the award three times, those from Yorkshire have won it twice, while no other county has been represented more than once. The most recent winner is Alastair Cook, whose 563 runs helped Essex to secure the 2020 Bob Willis Trophy.

For six of the nine seasons that the award has been given, the Cricket Writers' Club County Championship Player of the Year has also been named one of the five Wisden Cricketers of the Year; only Wayne Madsen in 2013, Keaton Jennings in 2016 and Cook in 2020 missed out. Three of the winners also claimed awards voted on by the members of the Professional Cricketers' Association (the players' trade union) in the same season; Compton and Lyth won the PCA Player of the Year award in 2012 and 2014, while in 2017, Porter won the PCA Young Player of the Year.

The 2020 award was given for performances in the Bob Willis Trophy, which replaced the County Championship for the shortened 2020 season caused by the COVID-19 pandemic in the United Kingdom.

Winners

Notes

References

Awards established in 2012
County Championship
Cricket awards and rankings